Power Rangers Dino Fury are the twenty-eighth and twenty-ninth seasons of the American children's television program Power Rangers. The first season premiered on Nickelodeon on February 20, 2021, and concluded on December 18, 2021. It would be the last season of the show to air on the network. The second season premiered on Netflix on March 3, 2022, and concluded on September 29, 2022; making it the first season to air exclusively on an online streaming service.

The third season of Dino Fury and thirtieth Power Rangers season overall, re-titled Power Rangers Cosmic Fury was announced on August 28, 2022 and is scheduled to premiere on Netflix in late 2023. It will be a continuation of Dino Fury'''s storyline, making it the first series since Mighty Morphin Power Rangers to have the same cast for more than two seasons. As the 30th anniversary celebration of the franchise, Cosmic Fury will feature new original suits, with Zord and villain footage adapted from Uchu Sentai Kyuranger. The season will consist of 10 episodes. Cosmic Fury will be the first season of Power Rangers to feature a female Red Ranger for a full season.Dino Fury is the first television series produced by Entertainment One following its acquisition by Hasbro in 2019. The season is produced using footage, costumes, and props from Kishiryu Sentai Ryusoulger, the forty-third entry in the Japanese tokusatsu drama Super Sentai metaseries, also making it the fourth entry in the American series to utilize the motif of dinosaurs (having been preceded by Mighty Morphin Power Rangers, Power Rangers Dino Thunder, and Power Rangers Dino Charge) with minimal costume and prop elements being recycled from Ressha Sentai ToQger.Dino Fury won Outstanding Kids and Family Programming at the 33rd GLAAD Media Awards.

Plot
65 million years ago, the evil Sporix Beasts ravaged the planet Rafkon before traveling to Earth. However, six Rafkonian knights pursued them and, along with six dinosaurs, were granted the power to become Dino Fury Rangers by the Morphin' Masters. They captured the Sporix, though all were seemingly lost except for the Red Ranger, Zayto, who went into stasis to prevent the Sporix's escape. In the present, intergalactic warrior Void Knight accidentally unleashes the Sporix while trying to steal them, forcing Zayto and his friend, a cyborg dinosaur named Solon, to recruit a new team of Dino Fury Power Rangers to help in their fight.

Cast and characters

Rangers

 Russell Curry as Zayto, the Red Dino/Zenith Cosmic Fury Ranger
 Hunter Deno as Amelia Jones, the Pink Dino/Red Cosmic Fury Ranger
 Kai Moya as Ollie Akana, the Blue Dino/Cosmic Fury Ranger
 Tessa Rao as Izzy Garcia, the Green Dino/Cosmic Fury Ranger
 Chance Perez as Javi Garcia, the Black Dino/Cosmic Fury Ranger
 Jordon Fite as Aiyon, the Gold Dino/Cosmic Fury Ranger

Supporting characters
 Shavaughn Ruakere as Dr. Lani Akana
 Blair Strang as Warden Carlos Garcia
 Saraid de Silva as Rina Garcia 
 Josephine Davison as the voice of Solon
 Kira Josephson as Jane
 Victoria Abbott as J-Borg
 Benny Joy Smith as Annie
 Noah Paul as Stan  
 Greg Johnson as Ed "Pop-Pop" Jones
 Jacqueline Joe as Fern
 Max Crean as Adrian

Villains
 Jared Turner as Tarrick / Void Knight / Void King 
 Siobhan Marshall as Santaura / Void Queen 
 Torum Heng as the voice of Mucus (human form)
 Mark Mitchinson as the voice of Boomtower and Boomblaster
 Campbell Cooley as the voice of Slyther and Scrozzle
 Sara Wiseman as Arla (Slyther's disguise)
 Campbell Cooley as Mr. Wiz (Slyther's disguise)
 John Leigh as the voice of Wreckmate
 Andrew Laing as the voice of Lord Zedd
 Steve McCleary as the voice of Snageye and Nulleye
 Adrian Smith as the voice of Sizzurai

Guest stars
 Kelson Henderson as Mick Kanic
 Teuila Blakely as General Shaw

Episodes

Season 28 (2021)

Season 29 (2022)

 Production 
In an interview with Den of Geek, Executive Producer Simon Bennett said that Dino Fury was originally planned to be one 22-episode season before a second season was picked up and 22 additional episodes were ordered. Bennett said the additional episodes were to "plug the gaps" between episodes that were already written, while the overall storyline remained the same. Bennett said that beginning with Dino Fury, serialized episodes were allowed to be written, saying prior to Dino Fury'' standalone episodes were mandated apart from the first two episodes and last two episodes.

References

External links

 Official Power Rangers website
 

Dino Fury
2021 American television series debuts
2022 American television series endings
2021 Canadian television series debuts
2022 Canadian television series endings
2020s American LGBT-related television series
2020s American science fiction television series
2020s Canadian science fiction television series
2020s Canadian LGBT-related television series
2020s Nickelodeon original programming
American children's action television series
American children's adventure television series
American children's fantasy television series
Canadian children's action television series
Canadian children's fantasy television series
English-language Netflix original programming
Television series about dinosaurs
Television series by Hasbro Studios
Television series by Entertainment One
Television series created by Haim Saban
Television shows filmed in New Zealand